Phemister is a surname. Notable people with the surname include:

Dallas B. Phemister (1882–1951), American surgeon and researcher
Phemister graft, a type of bone graft
James Phemister (1893–1986), Scottish geologist
Thomas Phemister (1902–1982), Scottish geologist